Laredo is a town in the autonomous community of Cantabria, Spain. According to the 2008 census (INE), the municipality has a population of 12,648 inhabitants. In addition to Laredo, the municipality includes the villages of La Arenosa, El Callejo, Las Cárcobas, Las Casillas, La Pesquera, Tarrueza and Villante. Except from the last two, the other villages had been physically integrated into Laredo.

Located between the cities of Santander and Bilbao, Laredo is known in the region and nationally for "La Salvé", its 5 km long beach (7 km at high tide) and for the historic part of town dating back to Roman times. Its festivities in August are also well known due to the main event that occurs every year on the last Friday of August, known as la batalla de flores (the battle of the flowers), during which large floats entirely covered with flowers and petals are paraded along the central streets.

In Laredo (and many other cities in Spain) it is tradition for a group of men to parade a giant sardine through town at the end of carnival. At the end of this ritual, called Entierro de la Sardina ("burial of the sardine"), the sardine is burned on the beach after a fireworks display.

This town gave its name to the twin cities of Laredo and Nuevo Laredo on the U.S.-Mexico border.

Economy
Economically, Laredo is based on fishing and the service sector and tourism. Laredo is considered one of the main resorts on the Cantabrian coast. The local industry is based on the processing of fishery products, especially anchovies, and family businesses.

In Laredo, whose average income level is amongst the fifteen highest in Cantabria, the service sector employs over half the population (51.2%). Laredo Regional Hospital in Laredo serves the surrounding region.

Transport
Laredo is connected to Spanish transportation hubs Bilbao and Santander via Automoviles Luarca, S.A.. Bilbao is an hour to the east of Laredo, while Santander lies 40 minutes west. Madrid is a 5-hour bus journey away.

People from Laredo
 Bernardino de Escalante (1537-circa 1605), 16th-century writer.
 José Emilio Amavisca (1971–), retired footballer.
 Ignacio Rodríguez Ortiz (1982–), footballer.

Twin towns – Sister cities
  Cenon, France (since 1988)
  Dakhla, Sahrawi Republic (since 16 December 2011)
  Laredo, United States
  Nuevo Laredo, Mexico

Gallery

References

External links

Ayuntamiento de Laredo
Nostalgias Pejinas
Laredo – Cantabria 102 Municipios
Pictures of Laredo

Municipalities in Cantabria
Port cities and towns on the Spanish Atlantic coast